Sauro Succi is an Italian scientist, internationally credited for being one of the founders of the successful Lattice Boltzmann method for fluid dynamics and soft matter.

From 1995 to 2018, Succi has been research director at the Istituto Applicazioni Calcolo of the National Research Council (CNR) in Rome.
Since 2018, he has been appointed principal investigator of the research line Mesoscale Simulations at the Italian Institute of Technology (IIT).

He is also a research affiliate to the Physics Department at Harvard University (since 2000), Fellow of the Freiburg Institute for Advanced Studies (FRIAS) and senior fellow of the Erwin Schrödinger International Institute for Mathematical Physics.

He is an alumnus of the University of Bologna, from which he earned a degree in nuclear engineering, and the École Polytechnique Fédérale de Lausanne, from which he obtained a PhD in plasma physics .

He has published extensively in plasma physics,
fluid dynamics, kinetic theory, quantum fluids and soft, flowing matter.

He has also authored the well-known monographs "The lattice Boltzmann
Equation for fluid dynamics and beyond", (2001, Clarendon Press.)   and "The Lattice Boltzmann Equation for complex States of Flowing Matter", (2018, Oxford Univ. Press.) 
"Sailing the Ocean of Complexity: lessons from the physics-biology frontier", (2022, Oxford Univ. Press.)
.

Dr Succi has been holding visiting/teaching appointments at many academic Institutions, such as the University of Harvard, Paris VI, University of Chicago, Yale, Tufts, Queen Mary London, Scuola Normale Superiore di Pisa and the Swiss Polytechnic of Zürich (ETHZ).

Since 2014, he is visiting professor at the IACS (Institute of Applied Computational Science of Harvard University), where he teaches Computational Methods for the Physical Sciences (AM227).

Dr Succi is an elected Fellow of the American Physical Society (1998).  He has received the Humboldt Prize in physics (2002), the Killam Award bestowed by the University of Calgary (2005) and the Raman Chair of the Indian Academy of Sciences (2011) and the Sigillum Magnum of the University of Bologna (2018). He also served as an external senior fellow at the Freiburg Institute for Advanced Studies (2009–2013), senior fellow of the Erwin Schrödinger International Institute for Mathematical Physics in Vienna (2013) and Weston Chair at the Weizmann Institute of Science in Rehovot (2016) and External Faculty Member of the Institute for Advanced Studies of Amsterdam (2017).
In 2022 he has been appointed Honorary Professor at University College London.

Dr Succi is an elected member of the Academia Europaea (2015), and he features in the list of Top Italian Scientists

He has been awarded the 2017 APS Aneesur Rahman Prize for Computational Physics.

In 2017 he has been awarded the ERC Advanced Grant "Computational design of porous mesoscale materials (COPMAT)".

He has been awarded the 2019 Berni J. Alder CECAM Prize for "having transformed the  Lattice-Boltzmann method into an overarching framework for kinetic physical phenomena.  In addition, he has been pivotal in building and constantly inspiring a community now counting tens of thousands of researchers in academia and industry, all across chemistry and physics, and reaching into more distant fields such as engineering or biology".

References

External links
 Dr. Succi's personal homepage 
 Killam Award 
 Raman Chair, Indian Academy of Sciences 
 Freiburg Institute for Advanced Studies 
 Biography; Freiburg Institute for Advanced Study
 The Erwin Schrödinger International Institute for Mathematical Physics 
 Weizmann Institute of Science 
 Aneesur Rahman Prize for Computational Physics, Official Page 
 Top Italian Scientists
 Berni J. Alder CECAM Prize, Official Page 

Living people
21st-century Italian physicists
University of Bologna alumni
Computational physicists
Year of birth missing (living people)